The British Academy Children and Young People Award for  is an award presented annually by the British Academy of Film and Television Arts (BAFTA). It is given to "games on any platform with a specific appeal to children and young people".

The category includes non-British productions that have been released in the United Kingdom. It was first presented in 2007 with Buzz! Junior: Jungle Party being the first recipient of the award. The category was named Video Game until 2012, since then, it is presented as just Game. Traveller's Tales is the developer with the most wins with three while Sony Interactive Entertainment is the publisher with most wins in the category with four.

Winners and nominees

2000s

2010s

2020s

Note: The series that don't have recipients on the tables had Production team credited as recipients for the award or nomination.

See also
 British Academy Games Award for Family

References

External links
Official website

Game